The Australian cricket selectors are a group of people appointed by Cricket Australia to be responsible for team selections for each of the Australian national sides in every form of cricket.

Current members for the Australian Men's Team are (as of November 2022): George Bailey (Chairman), Andrew McDonald (also Head Coach) and Tony Dodemaide. Current members for the Australian Women's Team are (as of November 2022): Shawn Flegler (Chairman), Shelley Nitschke (also Head Coach), Avril Fahey and Julie Hayes.

Australia's selection panel for the men's team was changed in November 2016 after a disappointing start to the summer which included back to back losses to South Africa at Perth and Hobart, the low point being the batting collapse for a total of 84 at Hobart. The preceding losses away to Sri Lanka in Tests (lost 0–3) and to the South Africans in One-dayers (lost 0–5) added further fuel to the fire forcing the ex-incumbent Rod Marsh to resign from his position of chairman of selection panel on the eve of 16 November 2016 taking moral responsibility for the debacle. Thereafter, on 17 November 2016, Trevor Hohns (already a member selector since May 2014), a former Australian leg spinner and a former national selector from 1993 to 2006, was appointed as the interim chairman of the selection panel. In addition, Greg Chappell, Cricket Australia's then National Talent Manager, was appointed as an interim selector to complete the selection panel also comprising Mark Waugh and Australia's Head Coach Darren Lehmann.

Until 2003, there would be a selection panel appointed by the former Australian Cricket Board which would pick players for home games and overseas tours. However, on the overseas tours selections would be done by a committee consisting of the captain, vice-captain and manager.

Some previous selectors - Australian men's team

John Benaud (1988–1990s)
David Boon (2000–11)
Allan Border (1998–2005)
Don Bradman (1936–52) (1953–71) – gave up selecting over the 1952–53 season because his son contracted polio
William Bruce
Thomas Carroll
Greg Chappell (1982–83) (1984–88) (2010–11)
Herbie Collins
Jamie Cox (2006–11)
Joe Darling
Alan Davidson
Charlie Dolling – died in 1936 while still a selector
Chappie Dwyer – sacked in 1952 over criticism of selection of Sid Barnes
Charles Eady
Syd Gregory
Dick Guy
Neil Harvey (1967–79)
Clem Hill
Jim Higgs
Andrew Hilditch (1996–2011)
Merv Hughes (2005–10)
Sam Loxton (1972–81)
Peter McAlister
Rick McCosker (1984–85)
Len Maddocks
Phil Ridings (1952–53) (1971–84)
Jack Ryder (1946–1970)
Laurie Sawle (1982–97)
Dudley Seddon (1954–67)
Bob Simpson (1987–97)
Trevor Hohns (1995–2005) (2016–21)

List of Australian Men's Team selection panels 
1928–29: Australia break convention and use four selectors
1929–30: Jack Ryder, R. L. Jones, C. E. Dolling – Jones and Dolling did not pick Ryder for the 1930 Ashes tour
1935–36: Chappie Dwyer, W Johnson, Vic Richardson
1936–37: Chappie Dwyer, W Johnson, Don Bradman
1937–38: Chappie Dwyer, W Johnson, Don Bradman
1946–47: Don Bradman, Jack Ryder, Chappie Dwyer
1947–48: Don Bradman, Jack Ryder, Chappie Dwyer
1948–49: Don Bradman, Jack Ryder, Chappie Dwyer
1950–51: Don Bradman, Jack Ryder, Chappie Dwyer
1951–52: Don Bradman, Jack Ryder, Chappie Dwyer
1952–53: Jack Ryder, Phil Ridings, Bill Brown
1954–55: Don Bradman, Jack Ryder, Dudley Seddon
1956–57: Don Bradman, Jack Ryder, Dudley Seddon
1957–58: Don Bradman, Jack Ryder, Dudley Seddon
1958–59: Don Bradman, Jack Ryder, Dudley Seddon
1960–61: Don Bradman, Jack Ryder, Dudley Seddon
1961–62: Don Bradman, Jack Ryder, Dudley Seddon
1962–63: Don Bradman, Jack Ryder, Dudley Seddon
1963–64: Don Bradman, Jack Ryder, Dudley Seddon
1964–65: Don Bradman, Jack Ryder, Dudley Seddon
1965–66: Don Bradman, Jack Ryder, Dudley Seddon
1966–67: Don Bradman, Jack Ryder, Dudley Seddon
1967–68: Don Bradman, Jack Ryder, Neil Harvey
1968–69: Don Bradman, Jack Ryder, Neil Harvey
1969–70: Don Bradman, Jack Ryder, Neil Harvey
1972–73: Phil Ridings, Sam Loxton, Neil Harvey
1973–74: Phil Ridings, Sam Loxton, Neil Harvey
1974–75: Phil Ridings, Sam Loxton, Neil Harvey
1975–76: Phil Ridings, Sam Loxton, Neil Harvey
1976–77: Phil Ridings (c), Sam Loxton, Neil Harvey – first time a chairman had been appointed
1977–78: Phil Ridings (c), Sam Loxton, Neil Harvey
1978–79: Phil Ridings (c), Sam Loxton, Neil Harvey
1979–80: Phil Ridings (c), Sam Loxton, Ray Lindwall, Alan Davidson
1980–81: Phil Ridings (c), Sam Loxton, Ray Lindwall, Alan Davidson
1981–82: Phil Ridings (c), Len Maddocks, Ray Lindwall, Alan Davidson
1982–83: Phil Ridings (c), Laurie Sawle, Ray Lindwall, Alan Davidson, Greg Chappell
1983–84: Phil Ridings (c), Laurie Sawle, Alan Davidson
1984–85: Laurie Sawle, Greg Chappell, Rick McCosker
1985–86: Laurie Sawle, Greg Chappell, Jim Higgs, Dick Guy
1986–87: Laurie Sawle, Greg Chappell, Jim Higgs, Dick Guy
1987–88: Laurie Sawle (c), Bob Simpson, Greg Chappell, Jim Higgs
1988–89: Laurie Sawle (c), Bob Simpson, Jim Higgs, John Benaud
1990–91: Laurie Sawle (c), Bob Simpson, Jim Higgs
1992–93: Laurie Sawle (c), Bob Simpson, Jim Higgs, John Benaud
1993–94: Laurie Sawle (c), Bob Simpson, Jim Higgs, Steve Bernard
1994–95: Laurie Sawle (c), Peter Taylor, Jim Higgs, Steve Bernard, Trevor Hohns
1995–96: Laurie Sawle (c), Peter Taylor, Jim Higgs, Steve Bernard, Trevor Hohns
1996–97: Trevor Hohns (c), Peter Taylor, Jim Higgs, Steve Bernard, Andrew Hilditch
1997–98: Trevor Hohns (c), Andrew Hilditch, Steve Bernard (panel reduced to three)
1998–99: Trevor Hohns (c), Andrew Hilditch, Allan Border
1999–2000: Trevor Hohns (c), Andrew Hilditch, Allan Border
2000–01: Trevor Hohns (c), Andrew Hilditch, David Boon, Allan Border
2001–02: Trevor Hohns (c), Andrew Hilditch, David Boon, Allan Border
2002–03: Trevor Hohns (c), Andrew Hilditch, David Boon, Allan Border
2003–04: Trevor Hohns (c), Andrew Hilditch, David Boon, Allan Border
2004–05: Trevor Hohns (c), Andrew Hilditch, David Boon, Allan Border
2005–06: Trevor Hohns (c), Andrew Hilditch, David Boon, Merv Hughes
2006–07: Andrew Hilditch (c), David Boon, Jamie Cox, Merv Hughes
2007–08: Andrew Hilditch (c), David Boon, Jamie Cox, Merv Hughes
2008–09: Andrew Hilditch (c), David Boon, Jamie Cox, Merv Hughes
2009–10: Andrew Hilditch (c), David Boon, Jamie Cox, Merv Hughes
2010–11: Andrew Hilditch (c), David Boon, Jamie Cox, Greg Chappell
2011–12: John Inverarity (c), Mickey Arthur, Michael Clarke, Rod Marsh, Andy Bichel
2012–13: John Inverarity (c), Darren Lehmann, Rod Marsh, Andy Bichel
2013–14: John Inverarity (c), Darren Lehmann, Rod Marsh, Andy Bichel
2014–15: Rod Marsh (c), Darren Lehmann, Mark Waugh, Trevor Hohns
2015–16: Rod Marsh (c), Darren Lehmann, Mark Waugh, Trevor Hohns
2016–17: Trevor Hohns (c), Darren Lehmann, Mark Waugh, Greg Chappell 
2017–18: Trevor Hohns (c), Darren Lehmann, Mark Waugh (T20I only), Greg Chappell
2018–19: Trevor Hohns (c), Justin Langer, Greg Chappell
2019–20: Trevor Hohns (c), Justin Langer, Greg Chappell
2020–21: Trevor Hohns (c), Justin Langer, George Bailey
2021–22: George Bailey (c), Justin Langer, Tony Dodemaide
2022–present: George Bailey (c), Andrew McDonald, Tony Dodemaide

List of Australian Women's Team selection panels 
2012–14: Cathryn Fitzpatrick (c), Julie Hayes, Avril Fahey
2014–15: Shawn Flegler (c), Cathryn Fitzpatrick, Julie Hayes, Avril Fahey
2015–22: Shawn Flegler (c), Matthew Mott, Julie Hayes, Avril Fahey
2022–present: Shawn Flegler (c), Shelley Nitschke, Julie Hayes, Avril Fahey

References

Cricket selectors
Cricket administration in Australia